Out of the Ashes: Britain After the Riots is a 2011 book by the British Labour Party politician David Lammy about the 2011 England riots.

References

External links
 

2011 England riots
English non-fiction books
Books about politics of the United Kingdom
2011 non-fiction books
Random House books